Stevenson House may refer to:

 Stevenson House, East Lothian, Scotland
 Stevenson House (Monterey, California), listed on the National Register of Historic Places (NRHP)
 Stevenson House and Brickyard, Lavonia, Georgia, listed on the NRHP in Franklin County, Georgia
 Birthplace of Adlai E. Stevenson II, Los Angeles, Los Angeles County, California — where Adlai Stevenson I was born in 1900
 Dodson–Stevenson House, also known as the Adlai Stevenson I House, on North McLean Street on Franklin Square (Bloomington, Illinois), McLean County, Illinois — an 1869 house where Adlai Stevenson I lived
 Stevenson House (Bloomington, Illinois), also known as the Adlai E. Stevenson II House, on East Washington Street in Bloomington, McLean County, Illinois — where Adlai Stevenson II lived from 1906
 Adlai E. Stevenson I House, Metamora, Woodford County, Illinois — where Adlai Stevenson I lived from 1866
 Adlai E. Stevenson II Farm, also known as the Adlai E. Stevenson Historic Home, in Mettawa, Lake County, Illinois — where Adlai Stevenson II lived from 1936 to 1965
 Kimball–Stevenson House, Davenport, Iowa, NRHP-listed
 Samuel A. and Margaret Stevenson House, Des Moines, Iowa, listed on the NRHP in Polk County, Iowa
 Henry Stevenson House, Georgetown, Kentucky, listed on the NRHP in Scott County, Kentucky
 Dr. John E. Stevenson House, Union, Kentucky, listed on the NRHP in Boone County, Kentucky
 Stevenson House (Hammond, Louisiana), listed on the NRHP in Tangipahoa Parish, Louisiana
Stevenson House (Battle Creek, Michigan), a Michigan State Historic Site in Calhoun County
 Stevenson Cottage, Saranac Lake, New York, NRHP-listed
 Stevenson House (New Bern, North Carolina), in Craven County, NRHP-listed
 Joshua Stevenson House, Canal Winchester, Ohio, listed on the NRHP in Franklin County, Ohio
 Dr. William P. Stevenson House, Maryville, Tennessee, listed on the NRHP in Blount County, Tennessee
 Joseph R. and Mary M. Stevenson House, Houston, Texas, listed on the NRHP in Harris County, Texas
 Douglass–Stevenson House, Fontana, Wisconsin, listed on the NRHP in Walworth County, Wisconsin

See also
 Stephenson House (disambiguation)